Didier Auriol (born 18 August 1958) is a French former rally driver. Born in Montpellier and initially an ambulance driver, he competed in the World Rally Championship throughout the 1990s. He became World Rally Champion in 1994, the first driver from his country to do so. He was a factory candidate for Lancia, Toyota and Peugeot among others, before losing his seat at Škoda at the end of 2003. His sister Nadine was also involved in rallying as a co-driver, while his brother Gerrard was also a former rally driver.

Career
At the age of 21, Auriol started rallying in an old Simca 1000. He drove the Simca for two years before getting a Renault 5 Turbo to compete in the French Rally Championship. In 1986 he competed in a Metro 6R4. With this car, he won his first French Rallye Championship. He contested it again the following year, the first of the Group A years, in a Ford Sierra RS Cosworth and with his car he was French Rally Champion 1987 and 1988.

Auriol won his first World Championship event, the 1988 Tour de Corse, whilst driving a works Ford Sierra RS Cosworth. It was the only time that season when Lancia were beaten in a straight fight, and the Lancia team signed him for the following year. He remained with the team for four seasons, driving three successive versions of the then-dominant Lancia Delta Integrale.  In 1992, driving the final evolution of the car, he won six events in one season (a record until beaten by Sébastien Loeb in 2005), but poor results on other rounds and retirement on the last event of the season, the RAC Rally, handed the world championship to Carlos Sainz.

In 1993 Auriol switched to Toyota, and won his first event for the team, the Monte Carlo Rally. He did not win again that season, but the following year he won the Corsica, Argentina and San Remo rallies and went into the final round, in Great Britain, vying again with Sainz for the championship. Despite a poor showing on the rally he emerged as World Champion after the Spanish driver went off the road on the final day.  In 1995, he took the first win for the Celica GT-Four ST205 in Tour de Corse with Denis Giraudet, who replaced his regular co-driver Bernard Occelli who was experiencing a family problem at that time. However, later in the same season, on the Rally Catalunya, Toyota were found to have used an illegal device in the turbocharger to increase the power of the engine, and were excluded from the results of the 1995 championship and banned for next year.

In 1996 Auriol contested only two World Championship events. He drove for Subaru in Sweden and for Mitsubishi in San Remo. 1997 he entered in Monte Carlo with a private Ford, and drove couple of rallies with Toyota's new Corolla WRC.

In 1998 Auriol became a Toyota full-time driver. he earned one win and four podiums, finishing fifth in the overall standings. In 1999 he scored one win and seven wins, which placed him third in points.

As Toyota retired from World Rally Championship after 1999, Auriol moved to SEAT Sport, driving the SEAT Córdoba WRC E2. Using Auriol's experience, SEAT managed to grab the third podium place at the Safari Rally in Kenya, and later that season to launch their third evolution of the Córdoba WRC. However at the end of the season the Spanish manufacturer retired from WRC to focus on the development of a special series of high performance cars.

Auriol landed a drive with Peugeot Sport for the 2001 season, but he had a largely difficult season; only on asphalt-rallies was Auriol able to be quicker than his teammate, Marcus Grönholm. Auriol's only win that year came in Spain, whereas he scored three third places at Sanremo, Corse and Australia. 2002 was a kind of gap year for Auriol, and for 2003, Auriol signed with Škoda Motorsport, and played a notable part in the development work of the Škoda Fabia WRC.

Auriol is a six-time winner of the Tour de Corse, a record jointly held with Bernard Darniche.

WRC victories 

{|class="wikitable"
! Number
! Event
! Season
! Co-driver
! Car
|-
| 1
|  32ème Tour de Corse – Rallye de France
| 1988
| Bernard Occelli
| Ford Sierra RS Cosworth
|-
| 2
|  33ème Tour de Corse – Rallye de France
| 1989
| Bernard Occelli
| Lancia Delta Integrale
|-
| 3
|  58ème Rallye Automobile de Monte-Carlo
| 1990
| Bernard Occelli
| Lancia Delta Integrale 16V
|-
| 4
|  34ème Tour de Corse – Rallye de France
| 1990
| Bernard Occelli
| Lancia Delta Integrale 16V
|-
| 5
|  32º Rallye Sanremo – Rallye d'Italia
| 1990
| Bernard Occelli
| Lancia Delta Integrale 16V
|-
| 6
|  33º Rallye Sanremo – Rallye d'Italia
| 1991
| Bernard Occelli
| Lancia Delta Integrale 16V
|-
| 7
|  60ème Rallye Automobile de Monte-Carlo
| 1992
| Bernard Occelli
| Lancia Delta HF Integrale
|-
| 8
|  36ème Tour de Corse – Rallye de France
| 1992
| Bernard Occelli
| Lancia Delta HF Integrale
|-
| 9
|  39th Acropolis Rally
| 1992
| Bernard Occelli
| Lancia Delta HF Integrale
|-
| 10
|  12º Rally Argentina
| 1992
| Bernard Occelli
| Lancia Delta HF Integrale
|-
| 11
|  42nd 1000 Lakes Rally
| 1992
| Bernard Occelli
| Lancia Delta HF Integrale
|-
| 12
|  5th Telecom Rally Australia
| 1992
| Bernard Occelli
| Lancia Delta HF Integrale
|-
| 13
|  61ème Rallye Automobile de Monte-Carlo
| 1993
| Bernard Occelli
| Toyota Celica Turbo 4WD
|-
| 14
|  38ème Tour de Corse – Rallye de France
| 1994
| Bernard Occelli
| Toyota Celica Turbo 4WD
|-
| 15
|  14º Rally Argentina
| 1994
| Bernard Occelli
| Toyota Celica Turbo 4WD
|-
| 16
|  36º Rallye Sanremo – Rallye d'Italia
| 1994
| Bernard Occelli
| Toyota Celica Turbo 4WD
|-
| 17
|  39ème Tour de Corse – Rallye de France
| 1995
| Denis Giraudet
| Toyota Celica GT-Four ST205
|-
| 18
|  34º Rallye Catalunya-Costa Brava (Rallye de España)
| 1998
| Denis Giraudet
| Toyota Corolla WRC
|-
| 19
|  3rd China Rally
| 1999
| Denis Giraudet
| Toyota Corolla WRC
|-
| 20
|  37º Rallye Catalunya-Costa Brava (Rallye de España)
| 2001
| Denis Giraudet
| Peugeot 206 WRC
|}

WRC results

References

External links 
rallybase.nl – Dider Auriol's profile

1958 births
Lancia people
Sportspeople from Montpellier
World Rally Champions
World Rally Championship drivers
French rally drivers
Living people
Peugeot Sport drivers
Toyota Gazoo Racing drivers
Cupra Racing drivers
Škoda Motorsport drivers